Mission Broadcasting, Inc. is a television station group that owns 20 television stations in 17 markets in the United States. The group's chair is Nancie Smith, the widow of David S. Smith, who founded the company in 1996 and died in 2011. All but one of Mission's stations are located in markets where Nexstar Media Group also owns a station, and all of Mission's stations (including its lone stand-alone station) are managed by Nexstar through shared services and local marketing agreementseffectively creating duopolies between the top two stations in a market or in markets with too few stations or unique station owners to legally allow duopolies. The company moved its headquarters from Westlake, Ohio, to Wichita Falls, Texas, in 2018. The company's stations are based in markets as large as New York City and as small as Grand Junction, Colorado.

History 
In 1996, Mission Broadcasting was started with its first stations were WUPN in Greensboro and WUXP in Nashville. Both of these were owned by ABRY shareholders, and operated through an SSA by Sullivan Broadcasting, a company affiliated with ABRY Broadcast Partners, which was absorbed into Sinclair Broadcast Group in 1998. In 2001, Sinclair bought these two stations outright. Another related ABRY-affiliated company Bastet Broadcasting, was absorbed into Mission Broadcasting by 2002.

On December 19, 2013, Mission Broadcasting announced it was acquiring KFQX for $4 million. The sale was approved on February 27, 2017 and finalized on March 31.

2020 acquisitions 
On March 30, 2020, Mission agreed to acquire certain assets of KMSS-TV, KPEJ, and KLJB from Marshall Broadcasting Group for $49 million. The sale was completed on September 1, 2020.

On July 13, 2020, Nexstar transferred its option to purchase WPIX from E. W. Scripps Company to Mission Broadcasting. Mission exercised the option and announced it was acquiring WPIX for $75 million. Once the transaction closed on December 30, WPIX became Mission's first station in a market without an accompanied Nexstar station, as an outright acquisition of WPIX (which broadcasts on virtual and VHF digital channel 11, and is thus not eligible for a UHF discount) by Nexstar would have caused Nexstar to well exceed the 39 percent market reach cap.

On August 7, 2020, Mission announced the purchase of KWBQ and its satellites and KASY-TV from Tamer Media LLC. The sale was completed on November 16.

On August 21, 2020, it was reported that Mission would acquire WLAJ and WXXA from Shield Media. The sale was completed on November 23.

On August 31, 2020, it was announced that Nexstar executed an option to purchase WNAC-TV in Providence, Rhode Island, for $64,000. The option had been in place since 2003 when LIN TV-owned sister station WPRI-TV. Nexstar is assigning the WNAC license to Mission. The sale was completed on June 16, 2021.

Television stations 
Stations are arranged alphabetically by state and by city of license.

Former stations

See also 
Duopoly (broadcasting)
Cunningham Broadcasting and Deerfield Mediasimilar holding companies related to Sinclair Broadcast Group
White Knight Broadcasting

References

External links 

Mass media companies established in 1996
Television broadcasting companies of the United States
Nexstar Media Group
Wichita Falls, Texas
Companies based in Texas